Erica reunionensis is a species of flowering plant (angiosperms) in the heather family (Ericaceae). It is endemic to the island of Réunion in the Indian Ocean.

Erica reunionensis is the dominant treeline species in the mountains of Réunion.

References

reunionensis
Endemic flora of Réunion